Rock the World may refer to:
 Rock the World (Bubbles album), a 2001 album by Swedish girl band Bubbles
 "Rock the World", a song by Bubbles from Rock the World
 Rock the World (Five Star album), a 1988 album by British girl group Five Star
 Rock the World (Kick Axe album), a 1986 album by Canadian band Kick Axe
 "Rock the World", a song by Kick Axe from Rock the World
 "Rock the World", a song by Pantera from the album Power Metal
 "Rock the World", a song by The Script from the album Freedom Child
 "Rock the World", a song from the Bratz Rock Angelz soundtrack, 2005